Kraków is a city in southern Poland.

Krakow or Kraków may also refer to:
Kraków County, Poland, adjacent to the city of Kraków
Grand Duchy of Kraków (1846–1918), part of the Austrian Empire
Krakow am See, Mecklenburg-Western Pomerania, Germany
Krakau, Saxony, known as Krakow in Sorbian, a former town in Germany
Krackow, Germany, known as Kraków in Polish, a municipality in Mecklenburg-Vorpommern
Krąków, a village in central Poland
Krakow Township, Michigan, United States
Krakow, Missouri, United States
Krakow, Nebraska, United States
Krakow, Wisconsin, United States
King Levinsky, born as Harris Kraków (1910–1991), American heavyweight boxer

See also
Cracow (disambiguation)
Nowy Kraków, Greater Poland Voivodeship
Nowy Kraków, West Pomeranian Voivodeship